Commerce Building may refer to:

 Commerce Building (St. Paul, Minnesota), listed on the NRHP in Minnesota
 Commerce Building (Everett, Washington), listed on the NRHP in Washington
 Commerce Building, Washington, D.C., the Herbert C. Hoover Building, site of the National Aquarium
 Commerce Building/Hancock Building, Miami, Oklahoma, National Register of Historic Places listings in Ottawa County, Oklahoma
 Commerce Building, the former headquarters of the Port Authority of New York and New Jerser, formerly known as Union Inland Terminal #1 and now as 111 Eighth Avenue

See also
Chamber of Commerce Building (disambiguation)